The 2016 ITS Cup was a professional tennis tournament played on outdoor clay courts. It was the eighth edition of the tournament and part of the 2016 ITF Women's Circuit, offering a total of $50,000 in prize money. It took place in Olomouc, Czech Republic, on 11–17 July 2016.

Singles main draw entrants

Seeds 

 1 Rankings as of 27 June 2016.

Other entrants 
The following player received a wildcard into the singles main draw:
  Ekaterina Makarova
  Barbora Miklová
  Gabriela Pantůčková
  Anna Sisková

The following players received entry from the qualifying draw:
  Ágnes Bukta
  Pernilla Mendesová
  Lisa-Maria Moser
  Vendula Žovincová

Champions

Singles

 Elizaveta Kulichkova def.  Ekaterina Alexandrova, 4–6, 6–2, 6–1

Doubles

 Ema Burgić Bucko /  Jasmina Tinjić def.  Katharina Lehnert /  Anastasiya Shoshyna, 7–5, 6–3

External links 
 2016 ITS Cup at ITFtennis.com
  

2016 ITF Women's Circuit
2016 in Czech women's sport
2016 in Czech tennis
ITS Cup